John Murdoch (15 January 1818 – 29 January 1903) was a Scottish newspaper owner and editor and land reform campaigner who played a significant part in the campaign for crofters rights in the late 19th century

Career
Murdoch was born in Ardclach, Nairn. His father was John Murdoch and his mother was Mary Macpherson, the daughter of a sea captain. In 1827 the family moved to the island of Islay and Murdoch lived there until 1838, when he moved to work in a grocer's shop in Paisley.  Shortly afterwards he joined the Excise service, completing his training in Edinburgh. He served as an exciseman in Kilsyth, Lancashire and Ireland. He retired to Inverness and from 1873 until 1881 ran the campaigning newspaper, The Highlander.

Influences
In his youth in Islay he associated with the family of the laird, Walter Frederick Campbell, including the folklorist and Gaelic scholar, John Francis Campbell (Iain Òg Ile)(1822–85). His commitment to the Gaelic language and his hostility to landlordism appears to date from his Islay days.
In the 1840s Murdoch spent time in Armagh in Ulster and in Lancashire where he came into contact with Chartism and the views of Feargus O'Connor. The Chartists believed that a healthy rural population needed to own their own land and be free of the influence of landowners and employers.
In the 1850s and 60's Murdoch spent a number of years in Dublin where he encountered Irish Nationalism and radical Irish ideas on land reform. At this time he wrote articles for the Nationalist newspaper The Nation.
While working in Dublin in the 1850s he is said to have had an influence on Alexander Carmichael, a fellow Argyllshire Gael who, likewise, was employed as an exciseman.

The Highlander

On retiring to Inverness Murdoch quickly became a figure of prominence. He championed Mary MacPherson, Mairi Mhòr nan Oran, when she was put on trial. He is said to have arranged for her legal representation and may have introduced her to Charles Fraser-Mackintosh. Shortly after this he started his weekly publication, The Highlander, which ran until it succumbed to endemic financial difficulties in 1881. Professor Meek writes that the songs of Mairi Mhòr show the influence that The Highlander had on the opinions of ordinary Highland people, even though the paper was mainly in English.
 
Murdoch believed that a vicious system of land ownership was at the root of all ills in the Highlands and this could only be changed by the crofters or peasants taking the lead and standing up for themselves in a campaign for land reform. In common with other campaigners for Highland land reform Murdoch maintained that the crofters had an inalienable right to the land which, they asserted, had belonged to the clan as a whole and had not been the personal property of chief. He argued that a sustained attack on the Gaelic language and culture had all but destroyed the self-confidence and morale of the indigenous Highlanders and that this needed to be reversed as part of the land reform campaign. Murdoch's kilted figure became familiar in crofting townships as he urged crofters to organise and stand up for themselves. Affectionately known as Murchadh na Feilidh (Murdo the kilt), he encouraged the crofting population to set higher value on their country, race, lore and language.

Influence
Hunter credits him with bringing together urban middle class Gaels, who had lost contact with crofts and crofting but had retained a sense of their Gaelic identity, and the crofting communities of the Highlands and Islands Murdoch was possibly the single most influential individual in the creation of the atmosphere and situation that resulted in The Crofters' War, The Napier Commission and the resultant Crofters Act of the 1880s. Professor Meek suggests that Murdoch was a significant influence on the Rev. Donald MacCallum, a minister of the established Church of Scotland and one of the few clergymen to actively challenge landlords. MacCallum's campaigns at the time of the Crofters War sought to use the bible to justify land reform demands, a regular theme in Murdoch's writing.
While many of the leaders of the land reform movement were associated with the Liberal Party, Murdoch was a socialist. He stood unsuccessfully for the Scottish Land Restoration League in Partick at the 1885 general election, and persuaded Keir Hardie to stand as an Independent Labour candidate and was one of the chairs at the meeting to found the Scottish Labour Party. He died on 29 January 1903 at Saltcoats in Ayrshire, where he had moved with his wife some years previously. He is buried in Ardrossan cemetery.

References

Further reading
 Young, J.D. (1975), John Murdoch: A Land and Labour Pioneer, in Burnett, Ray (ed.), Calgacus 2, Summer 1975, pp. 14 & 15, 
 A Selection of John Murdoch's Editorials, in Calgacus 2, Summer 1975, pp. 16 – 19, 

1818 births
1903 deaths
Scottish human rights activists
Scottish journalists
Scottish socialists
Georgists